Events from the year 1838 in Ireland.

Events
4–22 April – the paddle steamer SS Sirius (1837) makes the Transatlantic Crossing to New York from Cork in eighteen days, though not using steam continuously.
15 August – following a year of widespread hunger the government institutes relief work and reduces the tithe rent for the poor by the Poor Law and Tithe Acts.
Foundation of a temperance society in Cork known as the Knights of Father Mathew by Theobald Mathew, a capuchin friar.

Births
January – Richard W. Dowling, victorious commander at the Second Battle of Sabine Pass in the American Civil War (died 1867).
2 February – Nathaniel Burslem, soldier, recipient of the Victoria Cross for gallantry in 1860 at the Taku Forts, China (died 1865).
13 February – Michael Sullivan, physician, professor and politician in Canada (died 1915).
26 March – William Edward Hartpole Lecky, historian (died 1903 in England).
3 June – Daniel O'Reilly, U.S. Representative from New York (died 1911).
5 July – William Robinson, gardener (died 1935).
8 July – Colonel John Burke, soldier in America (died 1914).
28 July – Augustus Nicholas Burke, artist (died 1891).
24 August – James Hamilton, 2nd Duke of Abercorn, politician and diplomat (died 1913).
11 September – John Ireland, third bishop and first Archbishop of Saint Paul, Minnesota (died 1918).
18 September – Sir Thomas Drew, architect, first designer of St Anne's Cathedral (died 1910).
1 November – Anthony Traill, provost of Trinity College Dublin (died 1914).
18 December – Michael Thomas Stenson, politician in Canada (died 1912).
Full date unknown
James Gildea, soldier and philanthropist, founded the Soldiers', Sailors' and Airmen's Families Association (died 1920).
John Philip Nolan, soldier, landowner and politician (died 1912).
Dudley Stagpoole, soldier, recipient of the Victoria Cross for gallantry in 1863 near Poutoko in Taranaki, New Zealand (died 1911).

Deaths

Amhlaoibh Ó Súilleabháin, author, teacher, draper and politician (born 1780).

References

 
Years of the 19th century in Ireland
1830s in Ireland
Ireland
 Ireland